"All Fall Down" is the 11th television play episode of the second season of the Australian anthology television series Australian Playhouse. "All Fall Down " originally aired on ABC on 2 October 1967.

It was a comedy and starred the Kessey twins, Katherine and Karen, in roles specifically written for them.

Cast
 Barry Creyton
 Robert McDarra
 Peter Rowley
 Katherine Kessey
 Karen Kessey

Production
Star Barry Creyton later recalled he "didn’t enjoy that... due to ego more than the script, though (laughs). My co-stars where these singing twins, two girls who were popular at the time (Katherine and Karen Kessey). At that time in the ‘60s, I was well enough known to have top billing and they didn’t give it to me, they gave it to the twins, and I was pretty pissed."

Reception
The Sydney Morning Herald said it was "a disaster."

See also
 List of television plays broadcast on Australian Broadcasting Corporation (1960s)

References

External links
 
 
 

1967 television plays
1967 Australian television episodes
1960s Australian television plays
Australian Playhouse (season 2) episodes